Tolpis barbata is a species of flowering plant in the family Asteraceae known by the common name European umbrella milkwort. It is native to southern Europe, including the Mediterranean, namely in Portugal, Spain, Morocco, Algeria, Tunisia and the British territory of Gibraltar and it is known in many other places as an introduced species and a common weed, such as in California and New South Wales.

References

External links
  — invasive plant species in California.
 

Cichorieae
Taxa named by Carl Linnaeus
Plants described in 1753